Funky Skunk, a mix album released in late summer 2005, has been framed within the project Public Works billed as a DJ Shadow/Obey reconstruction and co-production between Josh Davis (DJ Shadow) and Shepard Fairey, in concordance with a product line of shirts, stickers and box set.

Sample Sources
 "Baby Mama" by Three 6 Mafia
 "Full Time" by Yo Gotti
 "What Happened to that Boy?" by Baby
 "Play" (instrumental) by David Banner
 "Burn Rubber" by Too Short
 "We Like Them Girls" by Silkk the Shocker
 "Do the Granny" by New Birth
 "Natural Juices" by Magnum
 "The Corner" by Common
 "Never Scared" by BoneCrusher
 "Piledriver" by Dennis The Fox
 "Stud Spider" by Tony Joe White

DJ Shadow albums
2005 remix albums